The year 1988 was marked by many events that left an imprint on the history of Soviet and Russian Fine Arts.

Events
 Exhibition of works by Dmitry Belajev was opened in the Leningrad Union of Artists.
 Exhibition of works by Margarita Piskareva was opened in the Leningrad Union of Artists.
 Exhibition of works by Vasily Savinsky (1859–1937) was opened in the Museum of the Academy of Arts in Leningrad
 September 17 — In Voronezh on Prospekt of Revolution was unveiled a monument to Mitrofan Pyatnitsky (1864—1927), Russian Soviet musician, actor and collector of Russian folk songs, the founder and a first artistic director of the Pyatnitsky Choir. Authors of the monument sculptor Pack E., architect Dikunov I.
 January 8 — Exhibition of works by Nikolai Galakhov was opened in the Leningrad Union of Artists.
 Exhibition of works by Evgenia Antipova was opened in the Leningrad Union of Artists.
 Exhibition of works by Vladimir Ovchinnikov (1911–1978) was opened in the Leningrad Union of Artists.
 Exhibition of works by Victor Teterin was opened in the Leningrad Union of Artists.

Deaths
 January 1 — Anatoli Nenartovich, Russian soviet painter (born 1915).
 March 13 — Vladimir Sakson, Russian soviet painter and theatre artist (born 1927).
 May 5 — Nina Suzdaleva, Russian soviet painter (born 1939).
 June 5 — Avenir Parkhomenko, Russian soviet painter (born 1921).
 September 17 — Fiodor Smirnov,, Russian soviet painter, Honored Artist of the Russian Federation (born 1923).
 October 12 — Boris Utekhin, Russian soviet painter (born 1910).
 October 20 — Vladimir Gorb, Russian soviet painter, graphic artist, and art educator, Honored Art worker of the Russian Federation (born 1903).
 November 29 — Evsey Moiseenko,, Russian soviet painter, graphic artist, and art educator, People's Artist of the USSR (born 1916).
 December 8 — Alexandra Chestnokova, Russian soviet painter (born 1908).
 December 13 — Fyodor Reshetnikov,, Russian soviet painter, People's Artist of the USSR (born 1906).

See also
 List of Russian artists
 List of painters of Leningrad Union of Artists
 Saint Petersburg Union of Artists
 Russian culture
 1988 in the Soviet Union

References

Sources
 Савинский Василий Евмениевич (1859-1937). Путь к мастерству. Выставка произведений из фондов НИМ АХ СССР и собрания Т. В. Савинской. Каталог. Л., 1988.
 Антипова Евгения Петровна. Выставка произведений. Каталог. Л., Художник РСФСР, 1987.
 Владимир Иванович Овчинников. Выставка произведений. Каталог. Л., Художник РСФСР, 1984.
 Николай Николаевич Галахов. Выставка произведений. Каталог. Л., Художник РСФСР, 1987.
 Интерьер и натюрморт. Выставка произведений живописи художников Российской Федерации. Каталог. Л., Художник РСФСР, 1991.
 Беляев Дмитрий Васильевич. Выставка произведений. Каталог. Л., Художник РСФСР, 1988.
 Маргарита Алексеевна Пискарева. Выставка произведений. Каталог. Л., Художник РСФСР, 1988.
 Тетерин Виктор Кузьмич. Выставка произведений. Каталог. Л., Художник РСФСР, 1988.
 Artists of Peoples of the USSR. Biography Dictionary. Vol. 1. Moscow, Iskusstvo, 1970.
 Artists of Peoples of the USSR. Biography Dictionary. Vol. 2. Moscow, Iskusstvo, 1972.
 Directory of Members of Union of Artists of USSR. Volume 1,2. Moscow, Soviet Artist Edition, 1979.
 Directory of Members of the Leningrad branch of the Union of Artists of Russian Federation. Leningrad, Khudozhnik RSFSR, 1980.
 Artists of Peoples of the USSR. Biography Dictionary. Vol. 4 Book 1. Moscow, Iskusstvo, 1983.
 Directory of Members of the Leningrad branch of the Union of Artists of Russian Federation. - Leningrad: Khudozhnik RSFSR, 1987.
 Artists of peoples of the USSR. Biography Dictionary. Vol. 4 Book 2. - Saint Petersburg: Academic project humanitarian agency, 1995.
 Link of Times: 1932 - 1997. Artists - Members of Saint Petersburg Union of Artists of Russia. Exhibition catalogue. - Saint Petersburg: Manezh Central Exhibition Hall, 1997.
 Matthew C. Bown. Dictionary of 20th Century Russian and Soviet Painters 1900-1980s. - London: Izomar, 1998.
 Vern G. Swanson. Soviet Impressionism. - Woodbridge, England: Antique Collectors' Club, 2001.
 Время перемен. Искусство 1960—1985 в Советском Союзе. СПб., Государственный Русский музей, 2006.
 Sergei V. Ivanov. Unknown Socialist Realism. The Leningrad School. - Saint-Petersburg: NP-Print Edition, 2007. - , .
 Anniversary Directory graduates of Saint Petersburg State Academic Institute of Painting, Sculpture, and Architecture named after Ilya Repin, Russian Academy of Arts. 1915 - 2005. - Saint Petersburg: Pervotsvet Publishing House, 2007.

Art
Soviet Union